Mart Kuldkepp (born September 19, 1983) is an Estonian Scandinavianist, historian and translator. He is Associate Professor of Scandinavian History and Politics at University College London. Between 2011 and 2015, he worked in various positions in the Tartu University Scandinavian languages department, including as head of department and programme director.

Mart Kuldkepp's main research topics are Estonian and Scandinavian political and cultural contacts in the twentieth century, questions of Estonians' nordic identity, and Old Norse literature and culture. At the University of Tartu in 2014, he defended his doctoral dissertation on the subject "Estonia Gravitates towards Sweden: Nordic Identity and Activist Regionalism in World War I".

He has also been engaged in a thorough investigation of Aleksander Kesküla, and in 2015 received an Emerging Scholar Award from the Association for the Advancement of Baltic Studies.

Mart Kuldkepp belongs to the Estonian student society Veljesto. He is also a member of the Learned Estonian Society.

References

External links
 Kuldkepp's website
 Academia.edu page

1983 births
Living people
Academics of University College London
Old Norse studies scholars
Scandinavian studies scholars